Sardar Vallabhbhai Patel University of Agriculture and Technology (SVPUAT) is an agricultural university at Meerut in the Indian state of Uttar Pradesh. It was established  in 2002.

References

External links
 Official website

Agricultural universities and colleges in Uttar Pradesh
Organizations established in 2002
Education in Meerut
2002 establishments in Uttar Pradesh